Dame Peggy Gwendoline Koopman-Boyden  ( Boyden; born 16 August 1943) is a New Zealand gerontologist. A professor of social gerontology at the University of Waikato, she was accorded the title of professor emeritus when she retired in 2016.

Born in Dannevirke on 16 August 1943, she received her primary school education at Ormondville before moving to Maharahara West, and then attended Dannevirke High School, where she was prefect. In 1968, she married John Koopman, and the couple went on to have two children.

In 1990, Koopman-Boyden was awarded the New Zealand 1990 Commemoration Medal. In the 1997 New Year Honours, she was appointed a Companion of the New Zealand Order of Merit, for services to the elderly, and she was promoted to Dame Companion of the New Zealand Order of Merit, for services to seniors, in the 2017 Queen's Birthday Honours.

References

1943 births
Living people
Massey University alumni
Academic staff of the University of Waikato
New Zealand women academics
Gerontologists
Dames Companion of the New Zealand Order of Merit
People from Dannevirke
People educated at Dannevirke High School